In Aztec mythology, Chicomecōātl  "Seven Serpent", was the Aztec goddess of agriculture during the Middle Culture period.  She is sometimes called "goddess of nourishment", a goddess of plenty and the female aspect of maize.

More generally, Chicomecōātl can be described as a deity of food, drink, and human livelihood.

She is regarded as the female counterpart of the maize god Centeōtl, their symbol being an ear of corn. She is occasionally called Xilonen, (meaning doll made of corn), who was married also to Tezcatlipoca.

Significance of Name 
Chicomecōātl's name, "Seven Serpent", is thought to be a reference to the duality of the deity.  While she symbolizes the gathering of maize and agricultural prosperity, she also is thought to be harmful to the Aztecs, as she was thought to be of blame during years of poor harvest.

Appearance & Depiction 
Her appearance is mostly represented with red ochre on the face, paper headdress on top, water-flowers patterned shirt, and foam sandals on the bottom. She is also described as carrying a sun flower shield.

She is also often appeared with attributes of Chalchiuhtlicue, such as her headdress and the short lines rubbing down her cheeks. Chicomecōātl is usually distinguished by being shown carrying ears of maize.  She is shown in three different forms:

 As a young girl carrying flowers
As a woman who brings death with her embraces
As a mother who uses the sun as a shield

Festivals 
She is particularly recognized during Huey Tozoztli, the first of sequence of three festivals held in high season marking the harvest.  During the festival, her priestesses designate seed corn that is to be planted in the coming season.  To appease the deity, as well as to ask for good harvest, priests often engaged in child sacrifice.  Dried seed maize, harvested and retained for the following year, bore the title Chicomecōātl, while maize consumed following harvest season was generally referred to as Cinteotl.

See also
Centeōtl (Aztec god of maize)
Maya maize god

References

Aztec goddesses
Agricultural goddesses
Death goddesses
Solar goddesses
Harvest goddesses

Food goddesses
Food deities
Triple goddesses